Torre Cajetani is a comune (municipality) in the Province of Frosinone in the Italian region Lazio, located about  east of Rome and about  northwest of Frosinone.

Torre Cajetani borders the following municipalities: Fiuggi, Guarcino, Trivigliano.

The name derives from the Caetani family.

Since 2003, the city has maintained a partnership with Brwinow near Warsaw in Poland.

Main sights
Teofilatto-Caetani castle
Lago di Canterno and natural preserve

References

Cities and towns in Lazio